Jason Livingston (born 17 March 1971 in Croydon, London) is a former sprinter from the United Kingdom.

Livingston won the 60 metres sprint gold medal at the 1992 European Athletics Indoor Championships in Genoa, in a time of 6.53 seconds. He also represented Britain in the 100 metres at the 1991 World Championships in Tokyo, where he finished 5th in his heat in a time of 10.57 seconds.

In 1992, Livingston was selected to be part of the British team for the Olympic Games in Barcelona, but was sent home before the games began after failing a drugs test. After initially protesting his innocence, he later admitted taking a banned steroid but insisted he had done so inadvertently.

He returned to the sport in 1997 after serving a four-year ban. In 1999, he set a personal best time of 21.39 seconds over 200 metres (indoors).

Personal bests

  60 m -  6.51 seconds (indoor), Glasgow, 8 February 1992
 100 m - 10.09 seconds (outdoor), London, 13 June 1992
 200 m - 21.39 seconds (indoor), Birmingham, 17 January 1999

References

External links
 

Living people
1971 births
Athletes from London
People from Croydon
British male sprinters
English male sprinters
Doping cases in athletics
English sportspeople in doping cases